Ramnagar Fort  is a fort at the town of Ramnagar in the Udhampur district of Jammu and Kashmir, India. Ramnagar Fort is believed to have been built by Rajput Raja Suchet Singh, who died in 1844. His wife performed sati nearby. There is a Samadhi of Maharani at the site where the sati was performed. The fort was renovated and undertaken by the Archaeological Survey of India in 1972. It is a protected monument of the Archaeological department.

Architectural designs 
The ancient fort is square with polygonal bastions to support its four corners. The fortifications wall and the bastions rise to three storeys and are crowned with battlements and merinos. Around the central courtyard inside Ramnagar Fort, there are cells and vaulted chambers where cannonballs are stored. There are images of Ganesa, Durga, and Hanuman in the gateway. The fort is surrounded by a moat and access to it is gained through a narrow bridge on the southeastern side.

References

External links
 

Forts in Jammu and Kashmir
Rajput architecture
Tourist attractions in Udhampur district